The Academic Technology Approval Scheme (ATAS) is a scheme of the British government for certifying foreign students from outside the EU for entry into the United Kingdom to study or conduct research in certain sensitive technology-related fields. For these students, obtaining an ATAS certificate is a prerequisite for obtaining a visa. The ATAS was introduced on 1 November 2007 to prevent dissemination outside the UK of knowledge and skills that can be used to build and deliver weapons of mass destruction (WMD), by ensuring that applicants do not have links to Advanced Conventional Military Technology (ACMT), WMD programmes and their means of delivery.

Affected students undergo a screening system to validate their reasons for coming to the UK.
According to the Foreign and Commonwealth Office, the checks will attempt to filter out those students whose intentions are adverse to national security. Areas of study at which the ATAS is directed are chemistry, engineering, physics, biophysics, metallurgy and microbiology.

In the earlier "Voluntary Vetting Scheme", some universities (such as Bristol University) were voluntarily reporting suspicious students from certain countries (including Iran and Egypt) to the government. With the introduction of ATAS, Cambridge University, which had refused to take part in the voluntary system, was required to cooperate with the authorities, too.

ATAS was expanded on 1 October 2020 to include Advanced Conventional Military Technology (ACMT).

In March 2021, the FCDO informed universities that all researchers would require ATAS from 21 May.

References

External links
ATAS website

Border control
Counterterrorism in the United Kingdom
Higher education in the United Kingdom